The 1922 Pennsylvania gubernatorial election occurred on November 7, 1922. Incumbent Republican  governor William Sproul was not a candidate for re-election. Republican candidate Gifford Pinchot defeated Democratic candidate John A. McSparran to become Governor of Pennsylvania. John Stuchell Fisher unsuccessfully sought the Republican nomination.

Results

|-
|-bgcolor="#EEEEEE"
| colspan="3" align="right" | Totals
| align="right" | 1,464,603
| align="right" | 100.00%
|}

References

1922
Pennsylvania
Gubernatorial
November 1922 events